Bersin Ridge (‘Rid Bersin’ \'rid ber-'sin\) is the ice-covered ridge extending 14 km in southwest-northeast direction, 5 km wide and rising to 2016 m on Oscar II Coast, Graham Land in Antarctica.  It is situated between the upper course of Crane Glacier and its tributary Stob Glacier, and has precipitous and partly ice-free north extremity.

The feature is named after the settlement of Bersin in western Bulgaria.

Location

British mapping in 1974.

Maps
 Antarctic Digital Database (ADD). Scale 1:250000 topographic map of Antarctica. Scientific Committee on Antarctic Research (SCAR). Since 1993, regularly upgraded and updated.

Notes

References
 Bersin Ridge. SCAR Composite Antarctic Gazetteer.
 Bulgarian Antarctic Gazetteer. Antarctic Place-names Commission. (details in Bulgarian, basic data in English)

External links
 Bersin Ridge. Copernix satellite image

Ridges of Graham Land
Oscar II Coast
Bulgaria and the Antarctic